Sato kagura(里神楽), or village kagura, is a popular form of kagura that presents ritualized dance-dramas reenacting mythological themes, including the primal restoration of sunlight to the world. It is often heard during festivals, when musicians accompany their songs on flutes and a variety of drums.

See also
 Shinto
 Culture of Japan
 History of Japan
 Japanese mythology
 Jinja (Shinto)
 Libation
 Oomoto
 Religion in Japan
 Shinto music
 The Glossary of Shinto for an explanation of terms concerning Japanese Shinto, Shinto art, and Shinto shrine architecture.

Kagura